State Road 257 is a 31-mile route in Daviess and Pike counties in the U.S. State of Indiana.

Route description
State Road 257 begins in the small town of Stendal.  It winds north to pass through Pikeville, Velpen and Otwell.  It terminates in Washington.
From mile 6 in Otwell, Indiana, there is a five-mile straight stretch to mile 11 in the road. It moves on to Velpen, where it continues to make more curves through Pike County.

Major intersections

References

External links

257
Transportation in Daviess County, Indiana
Transportation in Pike County, Indiana